The 2020 season was the 115th season of competitive football in Norway.

The season was originally scheduled to start on 4 April, but due to the COVID-19 pandemic in Norway the football season was delayed. On 7 May 2020, the Norwegian government allowed the league to start on 16 June 2020.

The men's 3. divisjon and women's 2. divisjon, along with all other lower divisions, were cancelled due to the COVID-19 pandemic. The men's football cup was also cancelled.

Men's football

League season

Promotion and relegation

Eliteserien

1. divisjon

2. divisjon

Group 1

Promotion group 1

Group 2

Promotion group 2

Women's football

League season

Promotion and relegation

Toppserien

1. divisjon

Norwegian Women's Cup

Final

UEFA competitions

UEFA Champions League

Qualifying phase and play-off round

First qualifying round

|}

Second qualifying round

|}

Third qualifying round

|}

Play-off round

|}

UEFA Europa League

Qualifying phase and play-off round

First qualifying round

|}

Second qualifying round

|}

Third qualifying round

|}

Play-off round

|}

Group stage

Group B

The tournament continued into the 2021 season.

UEFA Women's Champions League

Qualifying rounds

First qualifying round

|}

Second qualifying round

|}

Knockout phase

Round of 32

|}
The tournament continued into the 2021 season.

National teams

Norway men's national football team

UEFA Euro 2020 qualifying

Play-offs path C

2020–21 UEFA Nations League B

Group 1

Norway women's national football team

UEFA Women's Euro 2021 qualifying

Group C

Notes

References

 
Seasons in Norwegian football